Badminton, for the 2013 Bolivarian Games, took place from 17 November to 21 November 2013.

Medal table
Key:

Medalists

Badminton tournaments in Peru

Events at the 2013 Bolivarian Games
2013 Bolivarian Games
Bolivarian Games